Rural Waiheke comprises the eastern and southern parts of Waiheke Island in the Hauraki Gulf near Auckland, in New Zealand. Apart from small settlements at Ōmiha and Orapiu, the area south and east of Onetangi is mostly private farmland. Waiheke Island Aerodrome is approximately in the centre of the island.

Whakanewha Regional Park is a 250 ha reserve with a substantial forest of native trees, a wetland and a beach.

Stony Batter is a 20 ha scenic reserve containing a former defence installation with an extensive system of tunnels.

Demographics
The statistical area of Waiheke East covers the rural area of Waiheke and also the smaller islands of the Hauraki Gulf including Ponui Island, Pakihi Island and Rotoroa Island, none of which have a substantial population.

Waiheke East had a population of 1,071 at the 2018 New Zealand census, an increase of 168 people (18.6%) since the 2013 census, and an increase of 249 people (30.3%) since the 2006 census. There were 435 households, comprising 522 males and 552 females, giving a sex ratio of 0.95 males per female. The median age was 49.9 years (compared with 37.4 years nationally), with 171 people (16.0%) aged under 15 years, 126 (11.8%) aged 15 to 29, 555 (51.8%) aged 30 to 64, and 219 (20.4%) aged 65 or older.

Ethnicities were 89.6% European/Pākehā, 11.8% Māori, 5.6% Pacific peoples, 2.8% Asian, and 3.6% other ethnicities. People may identify with more than one ethnicity.

The percentage of people born overseas was 29.1, compared with 27.1% nationally.

Although some people chose not to answer the census's question about religious affiliation, 63.0% had no religion, 24.4% were Christian, 0.6% had Māori religious beliefs, 0.6% were Hindu, 0.3% were Muslim, 1.4% were Buddhist and 2.8% had other religions.

Of those at least 15 years old, 297 (33.0%) people had a bachelor's or higher degree, and 111 (12.3%) people had no formal qualifications. The median income was $32,500, compared with $31,800 nationally. 189 people (21.0%) earned over $70,000 compared to 17.2% nationally. The employment status of those at least 15 was that 405 (45.0%) people were employed full-time, 171 (19.0%) were part-time, and 12 (1.3%) were unemployed.

Notes

Populated places on Waiheke Island